Faithorn is an unincorporated community in Menominee County in the U.S. state of Michigan.

History

Faithorn began as a lumbering town and had a post office from 1903 or 1905 until 1955. It is named after the Chicago railroad man John Nicholson Faithorn (1852–1914).

Images

References

Notes

Sources

Unincorporated communities in Menominee County, Michigan
Marinette micropolitan area
Unincorporated communities in Michigan